Claus or Claux de Werve ( 1380–1439) was a sculptor active at the Burgundian court under Philip the Bold between 1395 and 1439. He was probably born in the Dutch city of Haarlem around 1380.

In 1396 he became the assistant to his uncle, Claus Sluter at the Burgundian court in Dijon, France. He helped his uncle carve the mourners on the tomb of Philip the Bold. Upon Sluter's death in 1406 he took over the position of Chief Sculptor at the court. As chief sculptor he produced a number of masterpieces, including the Virgin and the Child of Poligny, now at the Metropolitan Museum in New York.

Major works
 The Well of Moses (1396-1405), collaboration with Claus Sluter. De Werve particularly sculpted the weeping angelst
 The Tomb of Philip the Bold (1406-1410), begun by Jean de Marville and Claus Sluter and completed by de Werve. The latter sculpted almost all the statues of the mourners, as well as the angels.

References

Sources
 Antoine, Elisabeth. Art from the Court of Burgundy: The Patronage of Philip the Bold and John the Fearless, 1364-1419. Seattle (WA): University of Washington, 2005.

External links 
 Artcyclopedia
 Claux de Werve at the Netherlands Institute for Art History

1380s births
1439 deaths
15th-century French sculptors
Artists from Haarlem
Dutch male sculptors
Early Netherlandish sculptors
French male sculptors